Kim Ojo (born 2 December 1988) is a Nigerian professional footballer who last played as a centre forward for Lyngby BK in 2018.

Club career
Ojo was born in Warri, Nigeria. He began his career with Plateau United where he was discovered by FIFA agent Marcelo Houseman and in 2008 Atta Aneke took him on trial with Lyn Oslo. In February 2008 signed for Nybergsund and scored 14 goals during his first season there. In December 2009 he trained with TSV 1860 Munich while on trial there, at that time he had already trained with FC Midtjylland.

In September 2016 Ojo signed a one-year contract with Lyngby BK.

International career
In 2007, Ojo was called up to the Nigeria U-23 team.

Personal life
Kim Ojo is a Christian.

Career statistics

Honours
Genk
Belgian Cup: 2012–13

References

External links
 

1988 births
Living people
Sportspeople from Warri
Association football forwards
Nigerian Christians
Norwegian Christians
Nigerian footballers
Eliteserien players
Belgian Pro League players
Nemzeti Bajnokság I players
Danish Superliga players
Plateau United F.C. players
SK Brann players
Nybergsund IL players
K.R.C. Genk players
Oud-Heverlee Leuven players
Újpest FC players
Lyngby Boldklub players
Nigerian expatriate footballers
Expatriate footballers in Norway
Nigerian expatriate sportspeople in Norway
Expatriate footballers in Belgium
Nigerian expatriate sportspeople in Belgium
Expatriate footballers in Hungary
Nigerian expatriate sportspeople in Hungary
Expatriate men's footballers in Denmark
Nigerian expatriate sportspeople in Denmark